Vojtěch Petráček (born 17 February 1964 in Prague) is a Czech nuclear physicist and University Lecturer. Since February 2018, He has also been the rector of the Czech Technical University in Prague (CVUT) in Prague.

Education 
After attending the Nad Štolou Grammar School in the Letnány, Petráček studied mathematics and physics from 1982 at the Charles University, obtaining a doctorate in 1987.

Career 
In 2014 he unsuccessfully ran in the Rectorate election of the ČVUT, but in 2017 he was elected and at the end of January, 2018 he was appointed to this position by the Czech President Miloš Zeman with effect from 1. February 2018.

Publications 
 Vojtěch Petráček, as of 2018, has published 117 articles.

References

External links 
 Webpage of CVUT Prague

Living people
Scientists from Prague
Academic staff of Czech Technical University in Prague
1964 births
Charles University alumni